The Number of Magic is an album by the English musician Richard H. Kirk, released in 1995.

Critical reception

The Sydney Morning Herald deemed the album "a collection of almost-songs enlivened by [Kirk's] continuing fondness for blips, analogue sounds, distorted scraps of speech, exposing the chaos lurking behind the orderly veneer of technology."

AllMusic wrote that "Kirk uses an incredibly wide variety of sources for this album of gorgeous ambient ethno-funk, including electro, bleep, techno and Eastern melodies."

Track listing
 "Lost Souls on Funk" - 8:12
 "Love is Deep" - 7:44
 "So Digital" - 7:34
 "Indole Ring" - 8:40
 "East of Nima" - 9:41
 "Atomic" - 6:38
 "Poets Saints Revolutionaries" - 9:28
 "Monochrome Dream" - 9:31
 "The Number of Magic" - 10:07

Personnel
Richard H. Kirk: all instruments

References

1995 albums
Richard H. Kirk albums
Warp (record label) albums